Tumlingtar Airport  is a domestic airport located in Tumlingtar serving Sankhuwasabha District, a district in Province No. 1 in Nepal. It is the main tourist gateway to Makalu Barun National Park.

History
This airport was first conceptualized to provide air transport facilities to inaccessible areas of Mechi, Koshi and Sagarmatha zones. In 1965, the land for Tumlingtar airport was confiscated from the Kumals living in the Valley. Airport was initially built with a runway length of 3300 ft designed for DC-3s. A budget of NPR 2,60,000 was allocated for the fiscal year of 1971-72 for the purpose of construction of the fair weather airport. The airport started operations on 01 October, 1972.

Facilities

Airlines and destinations

Incidents and accidents 

 Cosmic Air DO-228 with Registration Number 9N AFS on 19 Nov 2000. There were no fatalities.
 Yeti Airlines DHC - 6/300 with Registration Number 9N AEV on 05 April 2001. There were no fatalities.

References

External links
 

Airports in Nepal
Buildings and structures in Sankhuwasabha District